Parliamentary elections were held in Portugal on 17 and 31 July 1836.

Electoral system
The elections were held under the Constitutional Charter of 1826 and the Electoral Law of 7 August 1826. These provided for a bicameral parliament, the Cortes Gerais, with an elected Chamber of Deputies and a Chamber of Most Worthy Peers whose members were appointed by the monarch or were members of the nobility. The elections were indirect, with voters electing provincial assemblies, who in turn elected members of the Chamber of Deputies. Voting and candidature were restricted to those who met income requirements. The number of Deputies was reduced from 143 in 1834 to 141, with 132 elected from multi-member constituencies on the mainland and islands, and nine from single-member constituencies in overseas colonies.

Results
The result was a victory for the ruling Cartistas, who won 79 seats. The opposition won 30 seats.

Aftermath
The newly elected Cortes Gerais did not meet, and fresh elections were held in November following the September Revolution.

References

Legislative elections in Portugal
1836 in Portugal
1836 elections in Europe
July 1836 events